Comödie Fürth is a theatre in the city of Fürth, Bavaria.

Theatres in Bavaria